Lance Louis (born April 24, 1985) is a former American football offensive guard. He was drafted by the Chicago Bears with pick 246 in the seventh round of the 2009 NFL Draft. He played college football at San Diego State.

College career
Louis played four years of football at San Diego State, playing tight end as a sophomore, guard as a junior, and started all twelve games senior year at right tackle.  In March 2010 he plea guilty to a misdemeanour assault charge relating to a fight with a teammate in a meeting room.  He was sentenced to three years of informal probation and a $565 fine.

Professional career

Chicago Bears
After not being invited to the NFL Combine, Louis was determined to perform admirably at SDSU's pro day. He lived up to the task, weighing in at 303 pounds and running a 4.76 second 40. He was drafted in the seventh round of the 2009 NFL Draft by the Chicago Bears.
2012
In Week 7, Louis recorded his first reception off a tipped pass from quarterback Jay Cutler.
In Week 12 of the 2012 season against the Minnesota Vikings, Louis tore his left ACL after getting blindsided by Jared Allen, and was placed on injured reserve. Allen was fined $20,000 for the hit.

Miami Dolphins 
Louis signed with the Miami Dolphins on March 27, 2013. He was later released on August 27, 2013.

Indianapolis Colts
On January 15, 2014, Louis signed a reserve/future contract with the Indianapolis Colts. He played in 9 games in 2014, 7 of which were starts.

References

External links

 Chicago Bears bio
 ESPN bio

1985 births
Living people
Players of American football from New Orleans
American football offensive guards
American football offensive tackles
San Diego State Aztecs football players
Chicago Bears players
Miami Dolphins players
Indianapolis Colts players